Freshmen is a comic book series published by Top Cow, co-created by Seth Green and Hugh Sterbakov. The publication is marketed as "The adventures of college freshmen with extraordinary powers." Issue #1 was dated June 8, 2005.

Freshmen II was released between November 2006 and July 2007.

Characters

The Freshmen

Others

Story

Freshmen: Introduction to Superpowers
Fourteen college freshmen are cast out of the main dormitory and forced to live in temporary housing in the Boughl Science Building where they are given superhuman powers by the "ax-cell-erator" after an explosion. Dr. Theodore Tomlinson asks for the help of the super-powered freshmen to repair the device. Kenneth "Norrin" Weismeyer (aka Wannabe) who is obsessed with comic book superheroes but who went for pizza at the time of the accident and has no superpowers talks the freshmen into becoming superheroes and fighting criminals. At first the Freshmen are mostly concerned with learning how to use their powers, but later some of the team begin wearing costumes. Although the team's first field assignment is successful their second field assignment is not and Seductress is critically injured by Rob the frat guy and his Hulking Frat Guys.

After the fallout of their first major battle with Rob the frat guy and the Hulking Frat Guys, the Freshmen deal with the loss of Seductress who is in a coma. The Intoxicator finds out that Dr. Theodore Tomlinson is giving Rob the frat guy and the Hulking Frat Guys their powers and The Puppeteer goes into Seductress's mind in hopes of waking her up, but finds dark memories in her. Wannabe is betraying the team to Dr. Tomlinson in hopes of getting his own superpowers. The final battle with Rob the frat guy and the Hulking Frat Guys is to stop them from spreading a disease to millions, and in the end Dr. Theodore Tomlinson, Rob the frat guy, and the Hulking Frat Guys are killed, Seductress wakes up and the team goes on Christmas break.

Norrin's Last Captain's Log
Norrin takes The Beaver home for Christmas break. After much soul searching and starting a working-out regime Norrin takes the new superhero name "The Scarlet Knight".

Freshmen II: Fundamentals of Fear
The Freshmen return after the Christmas break to the Boughl Science Building. Norrin Weismeyer meets Annalee Rogers's father and started to see a man who looks like Mr. Fiddlesticks, an old story book character of Norrin's childhood. Paula Pophouse has made a better recovery over the break. Annalee and Brady begin to have a romantic affair. Charles Levy is finding his power increasingly intolerable.  Norrin begins dating a woman named Amy. A new superhero, Leonard Kirk, joins the Freshmen. After meeting Brady, Annalee is kidnapped by her father. The Freshmen rush to save her.

Freshmen: Summer Vacation Special
The Team comes together (minus Jacques Lalleaux) to fight Susie, Charles Levy's ficus who is now a 50 feet monster plant and is still in love with him.

Trade paperbacks

Freshmen Vol.1: "Introduction to Superpowers"
Reprints of all six issues of the limited series.
Reprints of Freshmen Yearbook
Cover gallery
New introductions by creators Seth Green and Hugh Sterbakov
Features bonus 10-page text story: "Norrin's Last Captain's Log" featuring Norrin and The Beaver's  adventures during their Christmas break

Freshmen II: "Fundamentals of Fear"
Reprints of all six issues of the limited series.
Cover gallery
Characters' diaries and notebooks of Paula Pophouse, Elwood Johns, The Beaver and Liam Adams

References

External links
Freshmen Vol.I Comic Book DB
Freshmen Vol.II Comic Book DB
Freshmen: Yearbook Comic Book DB
Freshmen: Summer Vacation Special Comic Book DB

Top Cow titles
2005 comics debuts
Image Comics superheroes